Tarchonanthea coleoptrata is a species of tephritid or fruit flies in the genus Tarchonanthea of the family Tephritidae.

Distribution
Kenya, Tanzania.

References

Tephritinae
Diptera of Africa
Insects described in 1993